Alessandro Galeandro (born 29 February 2000) is an Italian footballer who plays as a forward for Alessandria in .

Career

AlbinoLeffe
In December 2017, following nearly seven years in the club's youth system, Galeandro signed his first professional contract with the club, a two and a half year deal. Galeandro made his competitive debut on 4 November 2018, coming on as an 88th minute substitute for Juri Gonzi in a 1–1 draw with Fano.

Alessandria
On 19 August 2022, Galeandro signed a two-year deal with Alessandria.

International
Galeandro was part of the Italy squad that earned Bronze at the 2019 Summer Universiade.

References

External links
Alessandro Galeandro at Football Database

2000 births
Living people
People from Sesto San Giovanni
U.C. AlbinoLeffe players
U.S. Alessandria Calcio 1912 players
Serie C players
Italian footballers
Association football forwards
Medalists at the 2019 Summer Universiade
Universiade bronze medalists for Italy
Universiade medalists in football
Sportspeople from the Metropolitan City of Milan
Footballers from Lombardy